Dunay in Iran may refer to:
 Dunay-e Olya
 Dunay-e Sofla